Bineta Sylla (born 20 September 1977) is a Senegalese footballer who plays as a defender. She has been a member of the Senegal women's national team.

Club career
Sylla has played for Sirènes Grand Yoff in Senegal.

International career
Sylla capped for Senegal at senior level during the 2012 African Women's Championship.

References

1977 births
Living people
Women's association football defenders
Senegalese women's footballers
Senegal women's international footballers